Ballerup is a Danish town, seat of the Ballerup Municipality, in the Region Hovedstaden.
There are approximately 25 schools in Ballerup Municipality. 
Ballerup has its own educational institution specialized in the study, training and research of music. It is twinned with East Kilbride in Scotland.

Geography
The town is situated in the north-western suburbs of Copenhagen and is part of Copenhagen's urban area.

Sport

Track Cycling

Ballerup Super Arena is the velodrome of Ballerup. It hosted the UCI Track Cycling World Championships in 2002 and 2010 and many rounds of the UCI Track Cycling World Cup Classics.

Notable people 
 Paul Høm (1905 in Ballerup – 1994) a Danish artist of religious paintings and brightly coloured stained glass windows

Sport 

 Karin Deleurand (born 1959 in Ballerup) a Danish former swimmer, competed at the 1976 Summer Olympics
 Dennis Otzen Jensen (born 1974 in Ballerup) a Danish former freestyle and butterfly swimmer, competed at the 2000 Summer Olympics 
 Matti Breschel (born 1984 in Ballerup) a Danish retired professional road racing cyclist
 Nikola Aistrup (born 1987 in Ballerup) a Danish former professional racing cyclist
 Nicolai Jørgensen (born 1991 in Ballerup) a Danish professional footballer with 240 club caps and 41 for Denmark
 Nicolai Boilesen  (born 1992 in Ballerup) a Danish footballer with 140 club caps
 Julie Finne-Ipsen (born 1995 in Ballerup) a Danish badminton player

See also
Ballerup station
Ballerup Super Arena

References

External links

 
Municipal seats in the Capital Region of Denmark
Municipal seats of Denmark
Copenhagen metropolitan area
Cities and towns in the Capital Region of Denmark
Ballerup Municipality